Darkly, Darkly, Venus Aversa is the ninth studio album by English extreme metal band Cradle of Filth. It was released on 1 November 2010 by record label Peaceville and is a concept album centred on the demon Lilith. It is Cradle of Filth's only album to feature keyboardist Ashley Ellyllon, and is also the band's final album with Dave Pybus as their bass player and James McIlroy as their second guitar player.

Background
Prior to its release the album was erroneously referred to as All Hallows Eve, probably because the announced release date was close to Halloween.

Concept and musical style
Darkly, Darkly, Venus Aversa is a concept album in the same vein as its predecessor Godspeed on the Devil's Thunder, this time centering on the demon Lilith, the first wife of the biblical Adam. Dani Filth revealed to Metal Hammer in September 2010 that it would be a "feminine" companion piece to Godspeed, "which was a very masculine album, obviously due to its protagonist, Gilles de Rais". Unlike previous historically-based concept albums Godspeed on the Devil's Thunder and Cruelty and the Beast, Darkly, Darkly tells an original story. "It's about the resurgence of Lilith into modern society as a deity", Filth said. "There's a bit of Victoriana in there. Essentially, at heart, it's a nice gothic horror story." Reference to Greek mythology and the Knights Templar is also made, in what was referred to by the label as "a dark tapestry of horror, madness and twisted sex". At an early stage of the album's development in August 2009, Filth hinted that the album's sound was "creepily melodic, like Mercyful Fate or a dark Iron Maiden". The Metal Hammer interview also likened it to King Diamond.

The core album is the band's first to not feature any instrumental tracks. The special edition bonus track "Adest Rosa Secreta Eros" is arguably an instrumental, but features extensive narrative excerpts taken from Aleister Crowley's The Book of the Law.

Release
On 20 August 2010, a free mp3 of the track "Lilith Immaculate" was released by the band as reward for signing up for a mailing list following the album's development. On 29 September Cradle of Filth released the first official video of the album for the track "Forgive Me Father (I Have Sinned)".

Darkly, Darkly, Venus Aversa was released on 1 November by record label Peaceville. A Limited Edition version of the album was released, and was packaged in a hard box containing:
 A second disc of bonus tracks and demos (including "Adest Rosa Secreta Eros", an exclusive track not available on any other edition of the album)
 DVD – the promo video for "Forgive Me Father (I Have Sinned)" plus a documentary on the making of the video
 A 64-page hardback book containing band photos, musings and artwork
 An exclusive T-shirt available only in this box
 A limited edition lenticular 3D image of the album cover art
 Five photographic prints
 An official certificate of authenticity from the band

Reception

The album received a generally favourable response from critics. Thom Jurek at AllMusic wrote that it "is tightly focused, employing CoF's trademark orchestral and keyboard elements to fine effect, with wildly intense... blastbeats from Marthus Skaroupka, and screaming guitars... courtesy of Paul Allender and James McEllroy. The concentration on writing and arrangement is disciplined, with a strong set of dynamics, a terrific mix, and great production". PopMatters was very favourable, writing "With some of the best compositions of its career, the highest-quality lyrics in its history, and none of the misfires it has suffered in the past, Cradle of Filth has delivered one of the best extreme metal releases in recent memory".

Darkly, Darkly, Venus Aversa sold 5,800 copies in its first week and debuted at position 99 on the Billboard 200 chart.

Track listing

Personnel
 Cradle of Filth
 Dani Filth – vocals, production
 Paul Allender – lead guitar
 James McIlroy – rhythm guitar
 Dave Pybus – bass
 Ashley Ellyllon – keyboards
 Martin Marthus Škaroupka – drums

 Additional personnel
 Mark Newby-Robson – orchestration
 Andy James – additional guitars
 Lucy Atkins – vocals
 Dora Kemp – backing vocals and choir
 Ralph Woodward – choir conductor and arranger
 Ruth McCabe, Tim Cutts, Craig Miller, Philippa Mann, Anna Asbach-Cullen – choir

 Technical personnel
 Scott Atkins – producer, engineer, mixing
 Doug Cook – producer, engineer
 Rupert Matthews – assistant engineer
 Andy Sneap – assistant engineer, mastering at Backstage Studios
 Natalie Shau – cover art

Charts

References

2010 albums
Cradle of Filth albums
Concept albums
Nuclear Blast albums
Peaceville Records albums